Agats is a town in Asmat Regency, South Papua, Indonesia. An elevated settlement on a tidal plain, a Dutch outpost was set up in Agats in 1938 and the town became notable for the cultural practices of the Asmat people. Following the formation of Asmat Regency in 2002, the town became its administrative seat.

Administrative villages
Agats District consists of 12 villages (kampung), namely:
 Asuwetsy
 Bis Agats
 Bisman
 Bou
 Briten (Biriten/Beriten)
 Kaye
 Mbait
 Per
 Saw
 Suwru
 Uwus
 Yamoth (Yomoth)

History
Though Agats had been populated by the Asmat people for some time, as a largely waterfront settlement, the first non-native settlement originated in the late 1930s when a Catholic mission was established in the area, and later in 1938 the Dutch East Indies government established an outpost there. Due to the Second World War, however, the Dutch abandoned the Agats post in 1942 due to the Japanese presence.

In 1953, the Catholic mission was made permanent and the following year the Dutch government of Netherlands New Guinea established a permanent post in Agats, banning headhunting practices. During this period, Asmat woodcarving became popular, with collectors, museum representatives, ethnographers and scientists visiting the area. One such person, Michael Rockefeller, disappeared after departing Agats for Southern Asmat in 1961, and was presumed dead. 

On 29 May 1969, the Roman Catholic Diocese of Agats was established, with American Alphonse Sowada becoming its first bishop. The Asmat Museum of Culture and Progress (Museum Kebudayaan dan Kemajuan Asmat) was opened in Agats in 1973. The Asmat Cultural Festival, held annually in the town, began in 1981.

After Asmat became its own regency in 2002, Agats – being its administrative seat – saw a boost in building due to a need for government facilities and an increase of migrants, largely Bugis and Moluccans, with the annual population growth of Agats being as high as 22 percent between 2005 and 2011 compared to 3 percent for Asmat Regency. In recent years, the wooden roads in Agats have begun to be replaced by concrete ones by the regency's government.

Following a major famine which struck Asmat Regency, in 2018 Indonesian President Joko Widodo offered to relocate residents of more remote areas to Agats, though the relocation faced significant resistance.

Geography 
Agats is located on the delta of the Asewets River, in a tidal lowland area.

Administratively, the urban settlement is located within the kampung of Bis Agats, which had a population of 8,998 in 2016.

Climate
Agats has a tropical rainforest climate (Köppen Af) with very heavy rainfall year-round.

Transport and facilities
Agats is served by pioneer, government-subsidized flights from Merauke and Mimika through the nearby Ewer Airport , in addition to passenger boats to Timika and Merauke. Both the airport and the river port are planned for upgrades in 2019, allowing the airport to take larger ATR aircraft and the river port to take larger "" ships. Recently introduced electric motorcycles are used for transport in the city, with electrical charging stations run by PLN.

A public hospital is present in Agats. As the water of the Asewetz next to the town is brackish and polluted, the town largely depends on rainwater and bottled water, in addition to pumped water from another river nearby.

Gallery

References

Footnotes

Bibliography

Asmat Regency
Regency seats of South Papua
Populated places established in 1938
1938 establishments in the Dutch East Indies